The National University of Callao is a post-secondary institution in the Bellavista District of the Constitutional Province of Callao in the country of Peru. It was established on 2 September 1966.

This scholarly institute retains its original technical character, unique to Peru. The University has maintained its technical character, and has grown to eleven departments, fifteen professional schools, and a postgraduate school.

Departments

The university had in 1967 the following departments:
Hydrobiological and fishing research
Industrial chemistry
Naval, industrial, mechanical, and electrical engineering
Economic and administrative sciences.

Now, in 2023, the UNAC has 11 Faculties and 17 careers:
 Fishing & Food Engineering
 Mechanical Engineering (named "Faculty of Mechanical & Energy Engineering")
 Electrical and Electronic Engineering
 Industrial & Systems Engineering
 Chemistry Engineering
 Accountancy
 Economics
 Management
 Nursing
 Physical Education
 Faculty of Science (Mathematics & Physics)
 Environmental Engineering

External links
The University's website (Spanish)

Universities in Peru
Educational institutions established in 1966
1966 establishments in Peru
Callao Region